Dawson Gurley, also known as Big Daws, is an American  YouTube personality, known for the channel Big Daws TV (stylized BigDawsTv) consisting of pranks, with a second channel called BigDawsVlogs consisting of vlogs and extra footage from his main channel.

Early life 
Gurley was born on May 19, 1993, in Olathe, Kansas and graduated from Olathe East High School. He then received an associate degree from Mesa Community College.

Gurley started making videos when he was 11 years old, inspired by Jackass movie after receiving a camera as gift for Christmas from his parents. Gurley started his YouTube career in 2012, filming videos on the campus of Arizona State University. Some of his videos started going viral in 2014. Through the Golden State Warriors' championship runs of the late 2010s-early 2020s, he became prominent among the team's fanbase for bearing a striking resemblance to star player Klay Thompson. Gurley reportedly tried to use that to his advantage by gaining access to the Chase Center court prior to Game 5 of the 2022 NBA Finals, which led to the team permanently banning him from the arena.

References 

1993 births
Living people
American YouTubers
Video bloggers
YouTube vloggers
People from Tempe, Arizona
People from Kansas City, Kansas
People from Kansas City, Missouri
People from the Kansas City metropolitan area
Prank YouTubers